The term deduplication refers generally to eliminating duplicate or redundant information.

Data deduplication, in computer storage, refers to the elimination of redundant data
Record linkage, in databases, refers to the task of finding entries that refer to the same entity in two or more files